Alli Haapasalo (born 3 October 1977) is a Finnish director and writer.

Early life and education
Haapasalo was born in Kerava, a town near Helsinki, where she attended the Nikkari School. The daughter of lawyers, she was initially interested in journalism and documentaries and began her studies in information science at the University of Tampere in 1996. During her year studying abroad in Stockholm, Haapasalo decided she wanted to pursue a more creative field. She applied to Aalto University, graduating with a Bachelor of Arts in Film Studies in 2003. She then went on to graduate with a Master of Fine Arts from New York University Tisch School of the Arts in 2009.

Career
Haapasalo first gained prominence through her thesis films, first the comedy short Ilona and later at Tisch the 60-minute long On Thin Ice, which had screenings at the 2009 Helsinki International Film Festival as well as the Brooklyn and Manhattan Film Festivals.

In 2015, Haapasalo returned to Finland when she was invited to direct and write the feature Love and Fury (2016). She collaborated with six other Finnish director-writers on the 2019 anthology film Force of Habit. The film was awarded Best Film in the International Competition at the 2020 Durban International Film Festival in South Africa and the Nordisk Film Award at the 2020 Jussi Awards. She also directed the Jarowskij Finland series Nyrkki.

Haapasalo directed the coming of age film Girl Picture from a screenplay by Ilona Ahti and Daniela Hakulinen. It premiered at the 2022 Sundance Film Festival in the United States where it received critical acclaim and won the Audience Award in the World Dramatic Competition. It has been chosen for the 72nd Berlin International Film Festival's Generation selection.

Personal life
Haapasalo lives in the Töölö neighbourhood of Helsinki with her American husband Christian Giordano and their children. They married in 2009, and Haapasalo became a naturalised U.S. citizen in 2014 before returning to Finland in 2015 for the more affordable cost of living.

Bibliography
 Mondo matkaopas (New York) (2011)

Filmography

Film

Television

References

External links
 

Living people
1977 births
21st-century Finnish women writers
Aalto University alumni
Finnish women film directors
Naturalized citizens of the United States
People from Kerava
Tisch School of the Arts alumni